inside/Absent is the third album by Broken Spindles, the solo project of Joel Petersen of The Faint and Beep Beep, which are all on Saddle Creek Records. It was released August 23, 2005.

Track listing
 "Inward" - 2:40
 "This Is an Introduction" - 3:20
 "Burn My Body" - 2:58
 "Please Don't Remember This" - 2:01
 "Desaturated" - 1:30
 "Birthday" - 2:53
 "Distance Is Nearsighted" - 2:40
 "Valentine" - 1:39
 "Anniversary" - 3:21
 "Painted Boy Face" - 3:07

External links
Saddle Creek Records

2005 albums
Broken Spindles albums
Saddle Creek Records albums